Rooker is a surname, and may refer to:

Brent Rooker (born 1994), American professional baseball player
Jeff Rooker, Baron Rooker (born 1941), British politician
Jim Rooker (born 1942), former American baseball player and broadcaster
Michael Angelo Rooker (1746–1801), English painter, illustrator and engraver
Michael Rooker (born 1955), American actor

You may also be looking for the Rooker-Feldman Doctrine relating to United States legal procedure.

Surnames